The 1969–70 Bradford City A.F.C. season was the 57th in the club's history.

The club finished 10th in Division Three, reached the 3rd round of the FA Cup, and the 4th round of the League Cup.

Sources

References

Bradford City A.F.C. seasons
Bradford City